The 1955 United Kingdom heatwave and associated drought were severe weather events that occurred over all parts of the country. The drought was the seventh worst recorded in Yorkshire and worse than that of the 1976 United Kingdom heat wave. It followed a period of extreme rain, mitigating its effects by water table and reservoir reduction.

See also

 Drought in the United Kingdom

References

Heat waves in the United Kingdom
Heatwave
United Kingdom Heat Wave, 1955
United Kingdom Heat Wave, 1955
1955 heat waves